Winson is a village in the Cotswold district of the English county of Gloucestershire.

Location
Winson lies next to the River Coln, north west of Bibury and south east of the Foss Way.

History
The Church of England parish church of St Michael's lies in centre the village and dates to before the mid 12th century.

Winson Manor is a grade II* listed building in the village. The country house was built in around 1740 for Richard Howse, Surgeon-General to the Army.

The village wheelwright was W. W. Field until he retired in around 1960. He displayed his collection of old tools connected to coach and wagon building and farming implements, on a private basis. When Field retired the business closed and some of his woodworking tools were purchased by the Museum of English Rural Life.

References

External links 

GENUKI page

Villages in Gloucestershire
Cotswold District